Parož is a dispersed settlement in the upper valley of Dobrnica Creek, a minor right tributary of the Hudinja River, in Slovenia. It belongs to the Municipality of Dobrna. The area is part of the traditional region of Styria. The municipality is now included in the Savinja Statistical Region.

References

External links
Parož on Geopedia

Populated places in the Municipality of Dobrna